There are over eighty-nine roller derby leagues in Australia. in women's, men's, co-ed and junior categories.

Governance

Skate Australia provides a minimal level of insurance for some roller derby leagues in Australia. According to Skate Australia's 2009–2013 strategic plan, the governance of roller derby is different from other sports affiliated with the organisation. Roller derby lacks state committees, with leagues going straight to the Development Officer and Sport Services Administrator. In 2006, there were no roller derby memberships in Skate Australia. By 2008, three percent of all members were from the roller derby community.

World cup team

Interstate Bouting
Between the Adelaide Roller Derby's 2007 formation and the start of their first season, the club hosted the first interstate roller derby competition in Australia, Skate of Origin, against the Victorian Roller Derby League.

2010 saw Adelaide Roller Derby hosting the Great Southern Slam – the largest roller derby competition to be held outside of the United States, with 650 competitors from Australia and New Zealand.

Adelaide Roller Derby again hosted The Great Southern Slam in the June long weekend of 2012 and this time boasted over 1000 participants in the main tournament, match play for less experience leagues, and a series of challenge bouts. The main tournament consisted of 18 leagues including two from New Zealand with Victorian Roller Derby League taking out top honours in a repeat performance from 2010 over Sun State Roller Girls.

By state

New South Wales
As of March 2013, there are 31 Roller Derby Leagues in NSW. There are several Sydney, New South Wales based teams including South Side Derby Dolls (S2D2), Sydney Roller Derby League, Western Sydney Rollers (WSR), South West Sydney Rockets Roller Derby League, Hawkesbury/Hills Area Roller Derby, Inner West Roller Derby League, Northern Beaches Roller Girls, and a University league, University of Sydney Roller Derby League. Roller derby is played outside the capital with leagues based in Coffs Harbour (Coffs Coast Derby Dolls), Illawarra (Wollongong Illawarra Roller Derby), Blue Mountains (Blue Mountains Roller Derby and Blue Mountains Junior Roller Derby), and Newcastle (Newcastle Roller Derby League).

In March 2012, fifteen women, led by Michael Frawley, started working on creating a league in Wagga Wagga.

Victoria
There are several Melbourne based roller derby leagues, including Diamond Valley Roller Derby Club, East Vic Roller Derby, Kingston City Rollers, Melbourne Northside Rollers, South Sea Roller Derby, Victorian Roller Derby League and WestSide Derby Dollz. Roller derby is also played in regional areas including Ballarat (Ballarat Roller Derby League), Bendigo (Dragon City Derby Dolls), Geelong (Geelong Roller Derby League), and Sale (Sale City Rollers).

Queensland
There are at least three Brisbane, Queensland-based roller derby leagues including the Northern Brisbane Rollers, the Sun State Roller Girls and the Brisbane City Rollers. Roller derby leagues also exist in regional parts of Queensland including in Blackwater (Blackwater Roll-Her Derby), Bundaberg (Rum City Derby Dolls), Mackay (Mackay City Roller Maidens), Townsville (Towns Villains Roller Derby), Cairns (Reef City Rollergirls), Gladstone (Gladstone Roller Derby), Gold Coast (Gold Coast Roller Derby), Rockhampton (Rocky Roller Derby), Toowoomba (Toowoomba City Rollers), and Hervey Bay Rollerz

Western Australia
There are various leagues in Western Australia. Western Australia Roller Derby (WARD), North West Roller Derby (NWRD), the Bunbury Roller Derby, Margaret River Roller Derby, Perth Roller Derby, Dread Pirate Rollers (DPR), and Perth Mens Derby (PMD), Swan City Derby (SCD), Perth Junior Roller Derby (PJRD), Albany Roller Derby League (ARDC), and Geraldton Roller Derby.

South Australia
Adelaide Roller Derby (ADRD), Murder City Roller Girls (MCRG), and Lil' Adelaide Rollers (LAR) (Co-ed junior league) are three roller derby leagues based in Adelaide, South Australia.

Tasmania
Roller derby is played in Tasmania, with two leagues based in Hobart, the Convict City Roller Derby League. and South Island Sirens. and Two leagues in Launceston; Devil State Derby League and Van Diemen Rollers.

Australian Capital Territory

There are two roller derby leagues in the Australian Capital Territory: The Canberra Roller Derby League and the Varsity Derby League. The sport was introduced to Canberra in 2008. by Bullseye Betty, Dr Hell, Roulette Rough and Peachy Keen. The league had its first bouting season in 2009, and tickets were quickly bought out. By June 2010, the Canberra Roller Derby League was competing in interstate bouts.

In the early years of roller derby in the ACT, the presence of the Canberra Roller Derby League helped change the perception of the sport in the capital from an entertaining sideshow to a mainstream women's participation sport. In 2011, to accommodate the growing interest in the sport, a student organisation expanded roller derby into the Australian National University. In late 2011, this organisation unaffiliated from the University and became Varsity Derby League. Varsity has a strong focus on inclusiveness and in 2014 established Canberra's first (and currently only) men's roller derby team.

Northern Territory
Roller derby is played in the Northern Territory. Darwin Rollergirls, based in Darwin were the first league established in the NT. There is a league based in Alice Springs called the Malice Springs Roller Derby League The first modern roller derby bout between these two leagues in October 2011 was entitled Highway to Roll and drew a sell-out crowd.

See also

 Roller derby

References

External links 
 Flat Track Stats (Australia)

 
Roller derby
Australia
Articles containing video clips